Terence William O'Shea (born December 3, 1966) is a former American professional football player who was a tight end in the National Football League (NFL) and the World League of American Football (WLAF). He played for the Pittsburgh Steelers of the NFL, and the Barcelona Dragons of the WLAF. O'Shea played collegiately at California University of Pennsylvania.

References

1966 births
Living people
American football tight ends
Barcelona Dragons players
California Vulcans football players
Pittsburgh Steelers players
Players of American football from Pittsburgh